Punjab Institute of Mental Health is an institute situated in Lahore, Pakistan. It is the largest psychiatric facility in South Asia.

History 
Johann Martin Honigberger was a Hungarian doctor who was the doctor of Maharaja Ranjit Singh from 1812 until Maharaja's death in 1839. He set up the first psychiatric ward just behind the gunpowder factory and started treating more patients after the Maharaja's death. He left for Europe when the East India Company annexed Punjab in 1849. Judicial Commissioner Robert Montgomery took control and decided to build a bigger and secluded facility.

It was in 1900 when Lahore Mental Hospital was built in 172 acres of land.

References 

Psychiatric hospitals in Pakistan
Hospitals in Lahore
1900s establishments in British India